Alexandra Raffé (born July 28, 1955) is a Canadian film and television producer. Among her projects are the films Zero Patience and I've Heard the Mermaids Singing, for which she was nominated for a Genie Award in 1987 for Best Picture.

References

External links
 Alexandra Raffé at the Internet Movie Database

1955 births
Film producers from Ontario
Canadian television producers
Canadian women television producers
Living people
Place of birth missing (living people)
Canadian women film producers